In medicine and specifically endocrinology, postprandial dip is a term used to refer to mild hypoglycemia occurring after ingestion of a heavy meal.

The dip is thought to be caused by a drop in blood glucose resulting from the body's own normal insulin secretion, which in turn is a response to the glucose load represented by the meal.
While postprandial dip is usually physiological after a generous meal, a very sharp or sustained drop in blood glucose may be associated with a disorder of glucose metabolism.

See also
 Postprandial somnolence
 Glucose metabolism
 Lateral hypothalamus
 Insulin resistance
 Hypoglycemia
 Oxyhyperglycemia
 Diabetes mellitus

References

Endocrinology